Isogamy is a form of sexual reproduction that involves gametes of the same morphology (indistinguishable in shape and size), found in most unicellular eukaryotes. Because both gametes look alike, they generally cannot be classified as male or female. Instead, organisms undergoing isogamy are said to have different mating types, most commonly noted as "+" and "−" strains.

Etymology 

The literal meaning of isogamy is "equal marriage" which refers to equal contribution of resources by both gametes to a zygote. The term isogamous was first used in the year 1887.

Characteristics of isogamous species 
Isogamous species often have two mating types. Some isogamous species have more than two mating types, but the number is usually lower than ten. In some extremely rare cases a species can have thousands of mating types. In all cases, fertilization occurs when gametes of two different mating types fuse to form a zygote.

Evolution 
It is generally accepted that isogamy is an ancestral state for anisogamy and that isogamy was the first stage in the evolution of sexual reproduction. Isogamous reproduction evolved independently in several lineages of plants and animals to anisogamous species with gametes of male and female types and subsequently to oogamous species in which the female gamete is very much larger than the male and has no ability to move. This pattern may have been driven by the physical constraints on the mechanisms by which two gametes get together as required for sexual reproduction.

Isogamy is the norm in unicellular eukaryote species, although it is possible that isogamy is evolutionarily stable in multicellular species.

Occurrence 
Almost all unicellular eukaryotes are isogamous. Among multicellular organisms, isogamy is restricted to fungi such as baker's yeast and algae. Many species of green algae are isogamous. It is typical in the genera Ulva, Hydrodictyon, Tetraspora, Zygnema, Spirogyra, Ulothrix, and Chlamydomonas. Many fungi are isogamous.

See also

Biology
 Anisogamy
 Evolution of sexual reproduction
 Gamete
 Mating in fungi
 Meiosis
 Oogamy
 Sex

Social anthropology
 Hypergamy
 Hypogamy

Notes and references

Reproduction
Germ cells
Charophyta